The 1977–78 NBA season was Indiana's second season in the National Basketball Association and 11th season as a franchise.

Draft picks

Roster

Regular season

Season standings

z – clinched division title
y – clinched division title
x – clinched playoff spot

Record vs. opponents

Awards and records
 Don Buse, NBA All-Defensive First Team

References

Indiana Pacers seasons
Indiana
Indiana Pacers
Indiana Pacers